The  Great Mosque of Constantine, or Djamâa El Kebir is a mosque located in Constantine, Algeria.

History 
The Great Mosque of Constantine is a historical mosque located in the city centre of Constantine in Larbi Ben M'hidi Street. The construction of the mosque dates back to 1135 AD, during the rule of the Hammadid dynasty, The mosque has submitted many changes, expansions and renovations during its long history. Including during the Ottoman era in 1766, and during the French occupation of Algeria.

See also

Ahmed Bey Palace
Emir Abdelkader Mosque
El Bey Mosque
Sidi Lakhdar Mosque

List of mosques in Algeria

Reference

Mosques completed in 1163
Mosques in Constantine, Algeria
Sunni mosques
Sunni Islam in Algeria
Landmarks in Algeria
Buildings and structures in Constantine Province
Ottoman Mosques in Algeria
1163 establishments in Algeria